The 2016–17 season was the 96th season in the history of CA Osasuna. During the 2016–17 season, the club competed in La Liga, after two years in the Segunda División, and the Copa del Rey.

Current squad

Competitions

Overall

La Liga

League table

Results summary

Results by matchday

Matches

La Liga

Copa del Rey

Round of 32

Round of 16

References

External links
Official website 
 Futbolme team profile 
BDFutbol team profile

CA Osasuna seasons
Osasuna
Osasuna